The Cooperation for Fair Trade in Africa (COFTA) is an organized social movement that aims to eliminate poverty through the fair distribution of profits during international trade.

COFTA is a national network of Fair Trade Organizations, Fair Trade Support Organizations, and Fair Trade Networks, all of which are certified members of the World Fair Trade Organization (WFTO).  
The COFTA network attempts to assist grassroots producers in the development of quality products as well as providing market access support to create better trading conditions for sustainable infrastructure.

Fair Trade
Although varying definitions exist for the term 'Fair Trade', in 2001 an agreed upon classification was created by FINE, a conglomerate of fair trade advocacy groups made up of International Fair Trade Association (IFAT) the Fair Trade Labeling Organizations International (FLO), the Network of European Worldshops (NEWS!), and the European Fair Trade Association (EFTA).
 

Fair Trade was defined as
" …a trading partnership, based on dialogue, transparency and respect, that seeks greater equity in international trade. It contributes to sustainable development by offering better trading conditions to, and securing the rights of, marginalized producers and workers – especially in the South. Fair Trade organisations (backed by consumers) are engaged actively in supporting producers, awareness raising and in campaigning for changes in the rules and practice of conventional international trade."

In the 2001 FINE document, the group also outlined 5 basic principles that act as criteria for trade to be considered fair. 
Fair Trade organizations must commit to Fair Trade as the principle core of their mission. Organizations can do this by providing financial, technical and organizational support to producers, raise awareness for the issues, and campaign for change.
Trade must be viewed as an equal partnership, and be mutually beneficial to both parties, achievable through mutual respect, transparency and accountability.
Fair Trade must improve trading conditions by paying a fair price for produce in the regional or local context, pre‐production financing, and must support long term trade partnership continuity.
Organizations must secure and improve upon producers and workers rights, providing living wage, safe workplace and ensuring that the labor standards defined by the International Labour Organization (ILO) are employed.
Finally, organizations must create a sustainable relationship with small producers and wageworkers, promoting long-term economic and social improvements through unionization, training, human recourses and environmental development.

History

History of Fair Trade
The history of fair trade started in the late 1940s in America, with the emergence of a number of organizations whose goal was to target corporations that symbolize the abuse of capitalism.
In 1946 the organization Ten Thousand Villages was created, and was the first official organization to support the idea of fair trade, and equal distribution of trade benefits.
The first formal World Fair Trade shops can also be traced back to America, where in 1958 outlets for needlework and small jewelry from Puerto Rico were sold at shop fronts.
The movement also saw growth in Europe, headed by Oxfam UK who sold craft good made by Chinese refugees in Oxfam shop front. Oxfam UK protested against the inequality existent within global capitalism, and established the first Fair Trade Organization in 1964.
The movement was gained further support after the 1968 United Nations Conference on Trade and Development (UNCTAD), which was held in Delhi. The conference addressed the issues faced by developing countries on the international political floor, putting emphasis on the creation of equitable trade agreements.
In 1973 Fair Trade Original was responsible for expanding the field of fair trade goods, importing the first fairly traded coffee from Guatemala. After the success of the Guatemalan coffee in the UK, the fair trade range expanded to include tea, cocoa, sugar, wine, spices and rice.
By 2008, coffee accounted for 64% of Fair Trade certified products in the United States. In 2009, the market share of Fair Trade products in the UK was valued at £300 million.

History of COFTA
Established in 2004 by regional African producers, COFTA main goal was to give a voice to African producers.
Thanks to the ratification of more Fair Trade recognized producers in the region, COFTA has become a continental Fair Trade Network. The COFTA business plan is based on network & member development, market access, advocacy & lobbying, and organizational growth and development.

In 2009 COFTA begun work with Fair Trade producers to nurture the growth of 10 countries networks and initiatives, in Kenya, Tanzania, Uganda, Rwanda, Ethiopia, South Africa, Swaziland, Zimbabwe, Senegal and Egypt. The aim of those country networks is to provide a forum for cooperative support, conducting needs assessments among members, and developing a database of producers and their product within an area.
 
COFTA claims that the success of the wider fair trade community's goals relies upon the creation of support networks for all members, and the continued maintenance of such relationships. 

COFTA has expanded to its current size of 70 member organizations and businesses in 22 countries, with importers buying in Europe, North America and the Pacific Rim. The organization's head office is located in Nairobi, Kenya. 
COFTA traded goods begun as predominantly handicraft produce, but have now broadened to include tea, coffee, vanilla, honey, dried fruit, juices, textiles producers.

COFTA Membership
An African producer can become a COFTA member by meeting certain criteria created by the organization in combination with the WFTO. To become an official Fair Trade Organization an individual or group must complete an application form, ratify with the Fair Trade code of practice, as well as providing a two-year trade history and legal standing accompanied by three referees who must be members of the WFTO.

List of COFTA Members

Programs

Rwanda producer Support Program
The Rwanda producer Support Program was designed to help produces create quality goods that would have a great chance of selling internationally, as well as educating said producers on how to engage in competitive global markets. The project was conducted from June 2008 to June 2011, where workshops and training session were provided for 50 handicraft producers, instructing vital business, financial and people skills needed to develop and maintain efficient business models. The workshops, conducted by 18 specially trained staff, attempted to promote the Fair Trade model of equality within the workplace, as well as the international market. The goal of this program was the creation of more adequate businesses that contributed further to incomes of the small Rwandan communities.

The Rwanda producer Support Program received a grant of £245,000 from the Big Lottery Fund (BIG), which was used to improve the business model of 50 handicraft businesses. From 2008 to 2011 the program created 1,178 jobs, and 49 of the businesses reported an increase in income.

Market Access Program (MAP)
Introduced in September 2009, the Market Access Program (MAP) is designed to increase the competitiveness of African Fair Trade producers towards in the global market. A total of 24  Hafrom Kenyighta, Uganda, Rwanda and Tanzania are currently involved in the MAP. The programs goal is a 25% increase of African products share in mainstream and Fair trade markets by 2012.

Fixed-Price Criticism
Although Fair Trade organizations claim their framework is designed to create equality in trade and business, a number of organizations have experienced scrutiny. The Fair Trade Labeling Organization (FLO), a member of FINE and affiliate of COFTA, has been accused of limiting the market potential of producers, as well as limiting benefits provided to growers and workers.
FLO, as well as other members of FINE, offer a fixed price for farmers on coffee lots. The process leads to many farms in one region selling their product for the one fixed price; the product is then milled together and sold by FLO as one large lot. This process creates a uniform product, that although can gain a fixed or "fair" price, does not take into account varying qualities of the mixed product. Colleen Haight, Assistant Professor in the economics department at San Jose State University, California, claims that this restricts farmer's from achieving specialty status for their product, limiting opportunity for gaining higher revenue in the open market, thus creating a Fair Trade monopoly.

Gaëlle Balineau also identifies the Fair Trade West-African cotton as being subject to a quality problem. Balineau suggests that if Fair Trade operations were to offer a higher price for higher quality product, this would create incentive and encourage produces to improve quality.

References

fruit juices